Delmas Perry "Del" Ballard Jr. (born 1 July 1963) is a professional ten-pin bowler and member of the Professional Bowlers Association.  He was a 2009 inductee into the PBA Hall of Fame, and a 2011 inductee into the USBC Hall of Fame. Ballard is the husband of top female bowler Carolyn Dorin-Ballard with whom he has one daughter. The Ballard family now resides in North Richland Hills, Texas. He is also the brother-in-law of another top female bowler, Cathy Dorin-Lizzi.

In recent years, Ballard has appeared laneside in several televised PBA matches, as a ball representative and coach for Storm Bowling.

Bowling career 
Ballard entered the PBA Tour in 1982 at the age of 19.  He won two titles in 1987, including his first major at the U.S. Open Championship which earned him a then-record $100,000.  In 1988, Ballard won his second major, the ABC Masters. (The Masters was not considered a PBA Tour event at the time, but is now recognized as a PBA title and a major).  He went on to win two additional majors, the 1989 Firestone Tournament of Champions and the 1993 U.S. Open.  In 1991, he had his most successful year on the tour, winning 4 titles.  He won 13 PBA Titles in his career (all between 1987–1993) and has career total earnings of $1,130,857.  He cashed in 259 of 482 tournaments.  In 31 TV appearances (the championship round of a Tour event) he had a 30–21 record, with a 216.29 average.

Ballard received an exemption for the 2006–07 PBA tour season, by finishing tenth in the Tour Trials.  He was unable to retain the exemption the following year.

No longer an active bowler on the standard PBA Tour, Ballard continues to work on tour as a ball rep/coach for Storm. He also manages the Motown Muscle PBA League team, while wife Carolyn manages the NYC Kingpins.

The "Ballard Gutter-Ball" Moment 
On March 2, 1991, Ballard was on the receiving end of one of the most bizarre and infamous incidents in PBA history.  In the nationally-televised championship match at the 1991 Fair Lanes Open tournament in Baltimore, Ballard faced Pete Weber for the title. Weber closed off with three strikes in the tenth frame, putting Ballard in a position where he needed two strikes and at least seven pins on the third ball to win. Ballard did throw the two strikes that he needed, but the third shot unfortunately came too close to the right channel and fell in, thus handing Pete Weber the title. Ballard recovered from this loss a few weeks later, defeating Jim Johnson Jr. to win the Long Island Open.

Ballard said the gutter ball incident changed him forever, and not in the way many would think:
"The next week was in New Jersey. As soon as I checked in, I received a phone call in my room. It was a male who asked if I was Del Ballard. I said 'yes'. The next comment...he says, 'you threw the ball in the gutter against Pete and it cost me, and now I’m going to get you.' I immediately hung up and called the front desk. I know I joke around a lot and expected some razzing from the guys, but they said this same person had called the hotel numerous times during the day from an outside number. I immediately checked out and changed hotels. I was a changed man from that day forward. I knew then the impact of what you do on the grand stage."

Personal life 
Ballard is married to Carolyn and has a daughter, Alyssa.

It was announced on PBA.com in August, 2010, that Ballard was battling tonsil cancer.  He underwent chemotherapy and radiation treatments at Texas Oncology, an affiliate of Baylor University Medical Center, and prognosis for a full recovery was good. Wanting to turn a negative into a positive, he and wife Carolyn, along with a few friends, got together after one of his treatments and organized the "Ballard vs. The Big C" bowling tournament. By 2017, the tournament had raised over $300,000, which was donated to Cancer Care Services, Baylor Health Care and the North Texas Laryngectomy Society. Ballard was recognized by the PBA for his efforts, being presented with the PBA Tony Reyes Community Service Award for the 2017 season.

Notable facts 
13 PBA titles, including four majors
Ballard needs only a PBA World championship title to complete both a Triple Crown and Grand Slam. (The Triple Crown for PBA Bowlers is The U.S. Open, PBA World Championship and Tournament of Champions. To complete the Grand Slam, a bowler must also win the USBC Masters.)
Ballard became the 11th bowler in PBA History to surpass $1 million in career earnings in 1994.
Ballard won the first six-figure first place prize in PBA History ($100,000 at the 1987 U.S. Open).
Ballard was ranked #29 on the PBA's 2008 list of "50 Greatest Players of the Last 50 Years."
Ballard was inducted into the PBA Hall of Fame on 24 January 2009.
Ballard was inducted into the USBC Hall of Fame on 1 July 2011.

References 

American ten-pin bowling players
1963 births
Living people
People from Keller, Texas
People from North Richland Hills, Texas